The Objective is a 2008 science fiction horror film directed by Daniel Myrick, and co-written by Myrick, Mark A. Patton, and Wesley Clark Jr. The film stars Jonas Ball, Matthew R. Anderson, and Michael C. Williams. The plot revolves around CIA Agent Benjamin Keynes recalling the time when he led a Special Forces team through the mountains of Afghanistan in search of an Afghan cleric, only to encounter strange paranormal incidents.

It premiered in Morocco in April 2008 and in the United States in February 2009.

Plot

In Ghazni Province, Afghanistan, a U.S. Army Special Forces team consisting of team leader Chief Warrant Officer  Wally Hamer, Master-Sergeant Kenny Tanner, and Sergeants Vince Degetau,  Joe Trinoski, Tim Cole, and Pete Sadler meets CIA Agent Benjamin Keynes, who indicates that their mission is to find a very important Afghan cleric by the name of Mohammed Aban. Hamer, briefs the men to be ready. After being inserted, the team finds a local guide, Abdul, in a village in Southern Afghanistan, where Aban is from. Together, they go to the mountains, where the cleric has a reputation for hiding.

As they go further into the mountains, they begin to have strange encounters. First, they are ambushed by gunmen who kill Trinoski. The team returns fire, killing multiple gunmen, but when they check the bodies, they have disappeared. That night, the team spots headlights of a vehicle approaching. However, the two lights separate and then speedily fly into the sky and disappear. After speculating on what the lights may have been, they radio for a helicopter to resupply them. The next day, they cannot get reception on their radio or GPS. Their truck, damaged from the ambush, is struggling to move up the mountain. At night, the team hears a helicopter approaching, though they cannot spot it. As their radio is not working, they attempt to signal the helicopter. As the helicopter, still unseen, seems to be directly on top of them, the noise abruptly stops (something that shouldn't be physically possible). Meanwhile, the radio picks up what sounds like Persian or Arabic, but no one can understand it. They cache Trinoski's body so that they can move to a safer position for the night. The next morning, the team finds parts of Trinoski's body strewn out across rocks. Further up the mountain, they spot strange, triangular markers made of sticks across the mountain's surface. As they continue on foot with their mission in the rocky and barren landscape, fatigue, frustration and confusion take their toll on the members of the team and they come across a cave. Inside, they find an old man who gives them shelter and refills their canteens. Sergeant Sadler notices that under the man's robes, he appears to be wearing a nineteenth-century British army uniform. Sadler tells the others of a legend of how a British regiment disappeared in Afghanistan's mountains, leaving only one survivor. In the morning Sergeant Cole observes the old man apparently talking to himself, but when Cole looks through his night vision goggles, he sees a group of men with swords in black robes. Panicking, the soldier opens fire, accidentally killing the old man. Abdul says they must bury the body, but Keynes orders the team to move on in case the enemy heard them. Degeteau develops horrible stomach pains. As he tries to drink from a canteen, he finds that it is filled with sand, as are the containers of everyone else. Further on, Abdul is surprised to find that there is an entire valley that wasn't there previously. Tensions further increase when the team encounters a bright light at night. As Tanner and Cole try to flank the light, they're immediately vaporized. The next morning, Abdul warns Keynes that they are dealing with something that is beyond human conception; he then commits suicide by stepping off a cliff.

As the team progresses further, the remaining soldiers confront Keynes and demand the truth. Keynes shows them a recording from his thermal imaging camera and informs them about the real motive. The thermal video shows a triangular object in the desert. Being nearly invisible to the naked eye, it lifts off the ground after three (supposed) men, including Mohammed Aban, walk to it and vanishes right in front of Keynes' eyes. It was this object that killed the men. The CIA has been monitoring this since 1980 and sent Keynes and the team there to further investigate it. The whole time, Keynes has been recording with his special thermal camera and sending the images to Langley via an advanced laser aimed at CIA satellites. Keynes theorizes that this object originates from an ancient Indian mythology called 'Vimanas', a sort of UFO-related phenomenon that occurred when Alexander the Great rode through this area of land as he was conquering, and the bright lights and the ghostly gunmen are associated with it. He also explains that the team is 'expendable', and they will not be rescued, which causes a brief scuffle with the agitated team leader, who disappears the next morning.

Running out of ammunition, water and food, the team wanders further into the desert where they finally encounter the vimanas at what appears to be the location that the British regiment was destroyed. Sadler, overwhelmed with fear, opens fire upon the seemingly invisible vimanas only to be vaporized. Keynes flees with Degetau and abandons him later, as he is too sick to continue, and later hears his screams before being obliterated by the objects. Exhausted and traumatized, Keynes searches for water. He encounters an oasis and drinks water from it only to discover the body of Hamer lying next to the water. Unable to grasp the horror, he passes out. When he wakes up, he hears the distant sound of a helicopter and fires his flare gun. Simultaneously, several flares fire up from the valley. The bright light he encountered earlier re-appears and two beings from it approach him. As it touches his forehead, he sees visions and hallucinations of various objects and landscapes from his previous encounters, causing him to go into a trance. He is shown floating several inches above a bed with a talisman he took from Aban's home in his hand, inside a hospital room, where doctors and a military colonel are watching him through a glass window. In a trance, he finally whispers, "It will save us all..."

In the final credits, interviews of Keynes' wife are shown in which she says that the family has not yet been informed about him and concludes him to be missing.

Cast
 Jonas Ball as CIA Agent Benjamin Keynes
 Matthew R. Anderson as Chief Warrant Officer Wally Hamer, 180A SF Warrant Officer 
 Jon Huertas as Sergeant Vincent Degetau, 18D SF Medical Sgt.
 Michael C. Williams as Sergeant Joe Trinoski, 18C SF Demolitions/Engineering Sgt. 	
 Sam Hunter as Sergeant Tim Cole, 18E SF Communications Sgt.
 Jeff Prewett as Sergeant Pete Sadler, 18B SF Weapons Sgt./Sniper 	
 Kenny Taylor as Master Sergeant Kenny Tanner, 18Z/18F Senior Team Sgt. / Intelligence Sgt. 
 Chems-Eddine Zinoune as Abdul
 P. David Miller as Major Matt McCarthy, 18A SF Officer 
 Vanessa Johansson as Stacy Keanes
 Jacqueline Harris as Matilde Seymour

Reception

On Rotten Tomatoes the film has an approval rating of 33% based on reviews from 12 critics.

References

External links
 
 
 

2008 films
Moroccan horror films
2008 horror films
2008 science fiction films
American science fiction horror films
2000s science fiction horror films
Horror war films
Science fiction war films
Films set in Afghanistan
War in Afghanistan (2001–2021) films
Films about United States Army Special Forces
Films about the Central Intelligence Agency
Films directed by Daniel Myrick
Films with screenplays by Daniel Myrick
Hindu mythology in popular culture
2000s English-language films
2000s American films